The South Africa men's national water polo team is the representative for South Africa in international men's water polo.

Results

Olympic Games

1952 – 14th place
1960 – 9th place
2020 – 12th place

World Championship

1994 – 15th place
1998 – 14th place
2005 – 15th place
2007 – 14th place
2009 – 15th place
2011 – 16th place
2013 – 15th place
2015 – 12th place
2017 – 16th place
2019 – 12th place
2022 – 12th place

World Cup

2014 – 8th place
2018 – 8th place

World League

 2009 – 8th place
 2010 – 8th place

Commonwealth Championship

 2002 – 7th place
 2006 – 4th place
 2014 – 4th place

Current squad
Roster for the 2020 Summer Olympics.

References

External links
Official website

Men's national water polo teams
 
Men's sport in South Africa